Ghrist is a surname. Notable people with the surname include:

 Jefferson L. Ghrist (born 1975), American politician
 Robert Ghrist (born 1969), American mathematician

See also
 Grist